The sun bear (Helarctos malayanus) is a species in the family Ursidae (the only species in the genus Helarctos) occurring in the tropical forests of Southeast Asia. It is stockily built, with large paws, strongly curved claws, small rounded ears and a short snout. The fur is generally jet-black, but can vary from grey to red. Sun bears get their name from the characteristic orange to cream coloured chest patch. Its unique morphology—inward-turned front feet, flattened chest, powerful forelimbs with large claws—suggests adaptations for climbing.

It is mainly active during the day, though nocturnality might be more common in areas frequented by humans. Sun bears tend to remain solitary but sometimes occur in pairs (such as a mother and her cub). They do not seem to hibernate, possibly because food resources are available the whole year throughout the range. Being omnivores, sun bears have a broad diet including ants, bees, beetles, honey, termites and plant material such as seeds and several kinds of fruits; vertebrates such as birds and deer are also eaten occasionally. They breed throughout the year; individuals become sexually mature at two to four years of age. Litters comprise one or two cubs that remain with their mother for around three years.

The range of the sun bear is bound by northeastern India to the north and extends south to southeast through Bangladesh, Cambodia, Myanmar, Laos, Thailand and Vietnam in mainland Asia to Brunei, Indonesia and Malaysia to the south. These bears are threatened by heavy deforestation and illegal hunting for food and the wildlife trade; they are also harmed in conflicts with humans when they enter farmlands, plantations and orchards. The global population is estimated to have declined by 35% over the past three decades. The IUCN has listed this species as vulnerable.

Etymology
The sun bear is named so for its characteristic orange to cream coloured, crescent-like chest patch. Another name is 'honey bear',  in Malay and Indonesian, in reference to its habit of feeding on honey from honeycombs. 'Honey bear' can also refer to the kinkajou.

Taxonomy and phylogeny
The scientific name Ursus malayanus was proposed by Stamford Raffles in 1821 who first described a sun bear from Sumatra. In 1825, Thomas Horsfield placed the species in a genus of its own, Helarctos, when describing a sun bear from Borneo.

Two subspecies have been proposed on the basis of variations in size:
 Malayan sun bear (H. m. malayanus) occurs on the Asian mainland and Sumatra.
 Bornean sun bear (H. m. euryspilus) occurs only in Borneo. Its skull is smaller than that of the Malayan sun bear.

H. anmamiticus, described by Pierre Marie Heude in 1901 from Annam, is not considered a distinct species, but is subordinated as a junior synonym to H. m. malayanus. In 1906, Richard Lydekker proposed another subspecies by the name H. m. wardii for a sun bear skull, noting its similarities to a skull from Tibet with a thicker coat; however the Tibetan specimen was later found to be an Asian black bear (Ursus thibetanus). Genetic differences between the two subspecies are obscure. It is considered to be monotypic.

Phylogeny 
The phylogenetic relationships among ursid species have remained ambiguous over the years. Noting the production of fertile hybrids between sun bears and sloth bears (Melursus ursinus), it was proposed that Helarctos be treated as a synonym of Melursus. However, studies differed on whether the two species were closely related. A 2007 phylogenetic study gives the relationships of the sun bear with other species of Ursidae based on complete mitochondrial DNA sequences as shown in the cladogram below.
Nuclear gene sequencing of bear species revealed that the sloth bear and the sun bear were the first Ursinae bears that radiated and are not included in the monophyletic Ursus group; moreover, all relationships between the bears were well resolved.

Characteristics

The sun bear is the smallest of all bear species. It is stockily built, with large paws, strongly curved claws, small rounded ears and a short snout. Adults weigh . The snout is grey, silver or orange. The fur is generally jet-black, but can vary from grey to red. The hair is silky and fine, and is the shortest of all bear species, suiting their hot tropical habitat. The characteristic chest patch, typically U-shaped but sometimes circular or spotlike, varies from orange or ochre-yellow to buff or cream, or even white. Some individuals may even lack the patch. Sun bears can expose the patch while standing on their hindfeet as a threat display against enemies. Infants are greyish black with a pale brown or white snout and the chest patch is dirty white; the coat of older juveniles may be dark brown. The underfur is particularly thick and black in adults, while the guard hairs are lighter. Two whirls occur on the shoulders, from whence the hair radiates in all directions. A crest is seen on the sides of the neck and a whorl occurs in the centre of the breast patch. The edges of the paws are tan or brown, and the soles are fur-less, which possibly is an adaptation for climbing trees. The claws are sickle-shaped; the front claws are long and heavy. The sympatric Asian black bear has cream-coloured chest markings of a similar shape as those of sun bears and different claw markings.

During feeding, the sun bear can extend its exceptionally long tongue to extract insects and honey. The teeth are very large, especially the canines, and the bite force quotient is high relative to its body size for reasons not well understood; a possible explanation could be its frequent opening of tropical hardwood trees with its powerful jaws and claws in pursuit of insects, larvae, or honey. The head is large, broad and heavy in proportion to the body, but the ears are proportionately smaller; the palate is wide in proportion to the skull. The overall unique morphology of this bear like its inward-turned front feet, flattened chest and powerful forelimbs with large claws indicates adaptations for extensive climbing.

Ecology and behaviour

Sun bears lead the most arboreal (tree-living) lifestyle among all bears. They are mainly active during the day, though nocturnality might be more common in areas frequented by humans. Bedding sites consist mainly of fallen hollow logs, but they also rest in standing trees with cavities, in cavities underneath fallen logs or tree roots, and in tree branches high above the ground. It is also an efficient swimmer. Sun bears are noted for their intelligence; a captive bear observed sugar being stored in a cupboard locked by a key, and later used its claw to open the lock. A study published in 2019 described skillful mimicry of facial expressions by sun bears, with precision comparable to that seen in gorillas and humans.

Sun bears are shy and reclusive animals, and usually do not attack humans unless provoked to do so, or if they are injured or with their cubs; their timid nature led these bears to be tamed often and kept as pets in the past. However, other sources state that sun bears are known as very fierce animals when surprised in the forest. They are typically solitary but are sometimes seen in pairs (such as mothers and cubs). Sun bears stand on their hindfeet for a broader view of their surroundings or smell far-off objects; they try to intimidate their enemies by displaying the chest patch if threatened. Vocalisations include grunts and snuffles while foraging for insects, and roars similar to those of a male orangutan during the breeding season; less commonly they may give out short barks (like a rhinoceros) when they are surprised. Sun bears do not seem to hibernate, possibly because food resources are available the whole year throughout the range. Tigers are major predators; dholes and leopards have also been recorded preying on sun bears but cases are relatively fewer. In one incident, a tiger-sun bear interaction resulted in a prolonged altercation and in the death of both animals. In another incident, a wild female sun bear was swallowed by a large reticulated python in East Kalimantan.

Diet

Sun bears are omnivores and feed on a broad variety of items such as ants, bees, beetles, honey, termites and plant material such as seeds and several kinds of fruits. Vertebrates such as birds, deer, eggs and reptiles may be eaten occasionally. They forage mostly at night. Sun bears tear open hollow trees with their long, sharp claws and teeth in search of wild bees and honey. They also break termite mounds and quickly lick and suck the contents, holding pieces of the broken mound with their front paws. They consume figs in large amounts and eat them whole. In a study in the forests of Kalimantan, fruits of Moraceae, Burseraceae and Myrtaceae species made up more than 50% of the fruit diet; in times of fruit scarcity, sun bears switched to a more insectivorous diet. A study in Central Borneo revealed that sun bears play an important role in the seed dispersal of Canarium pilosum (a tree in the family Burseraceae). Sun bears eat the centre of coconut palms, and crush oil-rich seeds such as acorns. Oil palms are nutritious but not enough for subsistence.

Reproduction
Sun bears are polyoestrous; births occur throughout the year. Oestrus lasts five to seven days. Sun bears become sexually mature at two to four years of age. Reported lengths for pregnancies vary from 95 to 240 days; pregnancy tends to be longer in zoos in temperate climate possibly due to delay in implantation or fertilisation. Births occur inside hollow tree cavities. A litter typically comprises one or two cubs weighing around  each. Cubs are born deaf with eyes closed. The eyes open at nearly 25 days but they remain blind till 50 days after birth; the sense of hearing improves over the first 50 days. Cubs younger than two months are dependent on external stimulation for defecation. Cubs are kept on buttress roots at the base of trees until they learn how to walk and climb properly. Mothers protect their cubs aggressively. Offspring remain with their mother for nearly the first three years of their lives. Lifespan in captivity is generally over 20 years; one individual lived for nearly 31 years.

Distribution and habitat

The sun bear is native to the tropical forests of Southeast Asia; its range is bound by northeastern India to the north and extends south to Bangladesh, Myanmar, Thailand, Cambodia, Laos and Vietnam to Brunei, Indonesia and Malaysia to the south. Its presence in China was confirmed in 2017 when it was sighted in Yingjiang County of Yunnan Province. It is extinct in Singapore.

These bears dwell primarily in two main types of forests throughout their range: deciduous and seasonally evergreen forests to the north of the Isthmus of Kra, and non-seasonal evergreen forests in Indonesia and Malaysia. They are typically found at low altitudes, such as below  in western Thailand and peninsular Malaysia. They occur in montane areas in northeast India, but may not extend farther north into the unfavourable and colder Himalayan region; their distribution might be restricted to the northwest due to competition with sloth bears. The sun bear is sympatric with the Asian black bear throughout the remaining areas in the mainland range featuring a mix of seasonal forest types, with monthly rainfall below  for a long spell of three to seven months. In mountainous areas, Asian black bears are more common than sun bears, probably due to scarcity of invertebrates to feed on. The major habitats in southern Thailand and peninsular Malaysia are moist evergreen forests, with more or less non-varying climate and heavy rainfall throughout the year, and low-lying or montane dipterocarp forests. Mangroves may be inhabited, but usually only when they are close to preferred habitat types.

The sun bear tends to avoid heavily logged forests and areas close to human settlement. However, sun bears have been seen in farmlands, plantations and orchards, where they may be considered vermin. A survey in Lower Kinabatangan Segama Wetlands showed that sun bears were feared but were not common in oil palm plantations; Bornean bearded pigs, elephants and macaques were far more damaging to crops. Sun bears have been reported preying on poultry and livestock.

Fossil remains suggest its occurrence farther north during the Pleistocene; it may have occurred as far south as Java in the middle to Late Pleistocene. Fossils also known from the Middle Pleistocene of Thailand along with Stegodon, gaur, wild water buffalo and other living and extinct mammals. Today, it has been eliminated from the majority of its erstwhile range, especially in Thailand; populations are declining in most of the range countries. It disappeared from Singapore during the 1800s and 1900s, possibly due to extensive deforestation. Sun bear populations appear to decrease in size northward from Sundaland, and numbers are especially low in the northern and western extremes of the range. This has possibly been the case since prehistoric times and is not a result of human interference.

Threats

According to the IUCN Bear Specialist Group, sun bear populations have fallen by an estimated 35% in the last three decades. Numbers are especially low in Bangladesh and China, and populations in Vietnam are feared to decline severely by 50–80% in the next 30 years. Habitat fragmentation is on the rise particularly in Borneo, Sumatra and some areas of the mainland range. Heavy deforestation (due to agriculture, logging and forest fires) and hunting for wildlife trade are severe threats throughout the range; human-bear conflicts are a relatively minor threat. Compared to other continents, southeastern Asia has undergone severe depletion in forest cover over the past few decades (by almost 12% between 1990 and 2010); this has resulted in substantial habitat loss for forest-dependent species such as sun bears. A 2007 study in East Borneo recorded severe loss of habitat and food resources due to droughts and forest fires brought about by the El Niño. With lack of research in predation, sources have documented very few predation events. In the island of Borneo sun bears were found to be hunted by python in their most vulnerable state. Pythons are successfully able to attack by taking advantage of the nighttime when the sun bears are sleep or nursing their cub. In Southeast Asia, the Panthera pardus (male leopard) has been photographed with a sun bear cub being held by the throat. This reported case has been reported to be the second confirmed predator as of 2019.
During surveys in Kalimantan between 1994 and 1997, interviewees admitted to hunting sun bears and indicated that sun bear meat is eaten by indigenous people in several areas in Kalimantan. Studies have found evidence of pet trade and sale of sun bear parts such as gall bladders in traditional Chinese medicine (TCM) shops in Sabah and Sarawak. In 2018 and 2019 a total of 128 TCM outlets in 24 locations across Sabah and Sarawak were surveyed and bear parts and derivatives were recorded for sale in 25% of the outlets surveyed – many of which would have been derived from locally-sourced sun bears. Sun bears were killed by shooting or administering poison to protect coconut and snakefruit plantations in East Kalimantan. A report published by TRAFFIC in 2011 showed that sun bears, along with Asian black bears and brown bears, are specifically targeted for the bear bile trade in southeastern Asia, and are kept in bear farms in Laos, Vietnam, and Myanmar. Poaching is common in several countries in the region. Hunting pressure is rising even in some protected areas; in the Nam Ha National Protected Area in Laos, hunter snares have been found that specifically target bears. A study in Nagaland (northeastern India) recorded a sparse distribution of sun bears in the Fakim and Ntangki National Parks, and reported extensive illegal hunting for food and trade in bear parts. Protective laws have shown little success in controlling these threats, especially due to poor execution and high potential for gains by the trade.

Conservation measures

The sun bear is listed as Vulnerable on the IUCN Red List, and is included in CITES Appendix I. With the exception of Sarawak (Malaysia) and Cambodia, the sun bear is legally protected from hunting in its whole range. A 2014 report documented rampant poaching and trade in sun bear parts in Sarawak, more than anywhere else in Malaysia; the researchers recommended stricter legislations in the state to protect local sun bears. 

The Bornean Sun Bear Conservation Centre, founded by Wong Siew Te in Sabah (Malaysia) in 2008, aims to work for the welfare of sun bears rescued from poor conditions in captivity and spread awareness about their conservation. The Malayan sun bears are part of an international captive-breeding program and a Species Survival Plan under the Association of Zoos and Aquariums since late 1994. Since that same year, the European breed registry for sun bears is kept in the Cologne Zoological Garden, Germany.

References

External links

 ARKive: Malayan Sun Bear (Helarctos malayanus)
 San Diego Zoo's Animal Bytes: Sun Bear
 Bornean Sun Bear Conservation
 The effects of selective logging on Malayan sun bears in lowland tropical rainforest of Borneo

sun bear
Fauna of Southeast Asia
Carnivorans of Malaysia
Extant Calabrian first appearances
sun bear
Species endangered by the pet trade